Mikulec is a Slavic surname. People with the name include:

Jindřich Mikulec (born 1928), Czech gymnast
Roman Mikulec (born 1972), Slovak politician

References

Croatian surnames
Czech-language surnames
Polish-language surnames
Slovak-language surnames